Drew Abbott (born January 13, 1947) is an American guitarist, who is best known for playing in Bob Seger's Silver Bullet Band, and appears on Bob Seger's Seven (1974), Beautiful Loser (1975), Live Bullet (1976), Night Moves (1976), Stranger in Town (1978), Against the Wind (1980), Nine Tonight (1981), and The Distance (1982).

Prior to working with Seger, Abbott played in Detroit-based power trio Third Power.

In 1983 he left the Silver Bullet Band during "The Distance" era because he did not like Seger's use of session musicians. Abbott relocated to Traverse City, Michigan where he formed the band Burning Circle with pianist Tim Sparling and former Savage Grace vocalist Al Jacquez. He currently plays in the Michigan-based band Leo Creek.

References

External links
 

American rock guitarists
American male guitarists
Bob Seger & the Silver Bullet Band members
1947 births
Living people
Place of birth missing (living people)
20th-century American guitarists
20th-century American male musicians